Giants of Science is an Australian geek rock band formed in Brisbane, Queensland in 1999. They refer to their music as "nerd-core" and have been influenced by Split Enz Swervedriver, Sparklehorse, Superchunk, Brisbane underground rockers the KT26ers, and Sonic's Rendezvous Band. They have supported MC5, Rollins Band, A Perfect Circle, and Mudhoney and have toured in Canada. Their album Here Is The Punishment debuted at #4 on the national AIR independent albums chart.

Discography

Albums
 Here Is The Punishment (Reverberation/+1 Records)
 The History of Warfare (Rhythm Ace)
 Live At The Troubador (+1 Records)

Singles and EPs
 I've Tried CD Single
 Blueprint For Courageous Action EP
 Sisters EP
 What’s Wrong With You And Why? EP

References

External links
Myspace page
The Metal Forge Giants of Science - Here Is The Punishment review
I-94 Bar reviews
The Electric Newspaper Giants of Science - Here is the Punishment review

Australian alternative rock groups
Musical groups from Brisbane
Geek rock groups
Musical groups established in 1999
1999 establishments in Australia